A telephone numbering plan is a type of numbering scheme used in telecommunication to assign telephone numbers to subscriber telephones or other telephony endpoints. Telephone numbers are the addresses of participants in a telephone network, reachable by a system of destination code routing. Telephone numbering plans are defined in each of the administrative regions of the public switched telephone network (PSTN) and in private telephone networks.

For public numbering systems, geographic location typically plays a role in the sequence of numbers assigned to each telephone subscriber. Many numbering plan administrators subdivide their territory of service into geographic regions designated by a prefix, often called an area code or city code, which is a set of digits forming the most-significant part of the dialing sequence to reach a telephone subscriber.

Numbering plans may follow a variety of design strategies which have often arisen from the historical evolution of individual telephone networks and local requirements. A broad division is commonly recognized between closed and open numbering plans. A closed numbering plan, as found in North America, features fixed-length area codes and local numbers, while an open numbering plan has a variance in the length of the area code, local number, or both of a telephone number assigned to a subscriber line. The latter type developed predominantly in Europe.

The International Telecommunication Union (ITU) has established a comprehensive numbering plan, designated E.164, for uniform interoperability of the networks of its member state or regional administrations. It is an open numbering plan, however, imposing a maximum length of 15 digits to telephone numbers. The standard defines a country calling code (country code) for each state or region which is prefixed to each national telephone number for international destination routing.

Private numbering plans exist in telephone networks that are privately operated in an enterprise or organizational campus. Such systems may be supported by a private branch exchange (PBX), which provides a central access point to the PSTN and also controls internal calls between telephone extensions.

In contrast to numbering plans, which determine telephone numbers assigned to subscriber stations, dialing plans establish the customer dialing procedures, i.e., the sequence of digits or symbols to be dialed to reach a destination. It is the manner in which the numbering plan is used. Even in closed numbering plans, it is not always necessary to dial all digits of a number. For example, an area code may often be omitted when the destination is in the same area as the calling station.

Telephone number structure
National or regional telecommunication administrations that are members of the International Telecommunication Union (ITU) use national telephone numbering plans that conform to international standard E.164.

E.164 specifies that a telephone number consist of a country calling code and a national telephone number. National telephone numbers are defined by national or regional numbering plans, such as the European Telephony Numbering Space, the North American Numbering Plan (NANP), or the UK number plan.

Within a national numbering plan, a complete destination telephone number is typically composed of an area code and a subscriber telephone number.

Many national numbering plans have developed from local historical requirements and progress or technological advancements, which resulted in a variety of structural characteristics of the telephone numbers assigned to telephones. In the United States, the industry decided in 1947 to unite all local telephone networks under one common numbering plan with a fixed length of ten digits for the national telephone number of each telephone, of which the last seven digits were known as the local directory number, or subscriber number. Such a numbering plan became known as a closed numbering plan. In several European countries, a different strategy prevailed, known as the open numbering plan, which features a variance in the length of the area code, the local number, or both.

Subscriber number
The subscriber number is the address assigned to a telephone line or wireless communication channel terminating at the customer equipment. The first few digits of the subscriber number may indicate smaller geographical scopes, such as towns or districts, based on municipal aspects, or individual telephone exchanges (central office code), such as a wire centers. In mobile networks they may indicate the network provider. Callers in a given area sometimes do not need to include area prefixes when dialing within the same area, but devices that dial telephone numbers automatically may include the full number with area and access codes.

The subscriber number is typically listed in local telephone directories, and is therefor often referred to as the directory number.

Area code
Telephone administrations that manage telecommunication infrastructure of extended size, such as a large country, often divide the territory into geographic areas. This benefits independent management by administrative or historical subdivisions, such as states and provinces, of the territory or country.  Each area of subdivision is identified in the numbering plan with a routing code. This concept was first developed in the planning for a nationwide numbering plan for Operator Toll Dialing and direct distance dialing (DDD) in the Bell System in the United States in the 1940s, a system that resulted in the North American Numbering Plan for World Zone 1. AT&T divided the United States and Canada into numbering plan areas (NPAs), and assigned to each NPA a unique three-digit prefix, the numbering plan area code, which became known in short-form as NPA code or simply area code. The area code is prefixed to each telephone number issued in its service area.

Other national telecommunication authorities use various formats and dialing rules for area codes. The size of area code prefixes may either be fixed or variable. Area codes in the NANP have three digits, while two digits are used in Brazil, one digit in Australia and New Zealand. Variable-length formats exist in multiple countries including: Argentina, Austria (1 to 4), Germany (2 to 5 digits), Japan (1 to 5), Mexico (2 or 3 digits), Peru (1 or 2), Syria (1 or 2) and the United Kingdom. In addition to digit count, the format may be restricted to certain digit patterns. For example, the NANP had at times specific restrictions on the range of digits for the three positions, and required assignment to geographical areas avoiding nearby areas receiving similar area codes to avoid confusion and misdialing.

Some countries, such as Denmark and Uruguay, have merged variable-length area codes and telephone numbers into fixed-length numbers that must always be dialed independently of location. In such administrations, the area code is not distinguished formally in the telephone number.

In the UK, area codes were first known as subscriber trunk dialling (STD) codes. Depending on local dialing plans, they are often necessary only when dialed from outside the code area or from mobile phones.  In North America ten-digit dialing is required in areas with overlay numbering plans, in which multiple area codes are assigned to the same area.

The strict correlation of a telephone to a geographical area has been broken by technical advances, such as local number portability and voice over IP services.

When dialing a telephone number, the area code may be preceded by a trunk prefix or national access code, the international access code, and country code.

Area codes are often quoted by including the national access code. For example, a number in London may be listed as 020 7946 0321. Users must correctly interpret 020 as the code for London. If they call from another station within London, they may merely dial 7946 0321, or if dialing from another country, the initial 0 should be omitted after the country code.

International numbering plan
The E.164 standard of the International Telecommunication Union is an international numbering plan and establishes a country calling code (country code) for each member organization. Country codes are prefixes to national telephone numbers that denote call routing to the network of a subordinate number plan administration, typically a country, or group of countries with a uniform numbering plan, such as the NANP. E.164 permits a maximum length of 15 digits for the complete international phone number consisting of the country code, the national routing code (area code), and the subscriber number.  E.164 does not define regional numbering plans, however, it does provide recommendations for new implementations and uniform representation of all telephone numbers.

Country code
Country codes are necessary only when dialing telephone numbers in other countries than the originating telephone, but many networks permit them for all calls. These are dialed before the national telephone number.

Following ITU-T specification E.123, international telephone numbers are commonly indicated in listings by prefixing the country code with a plus sign. This reminds the subscriber to dial the international access code of the country from which the call is placed. For example, the international dialing prefix or access code in all NANP countries is 011, and 00 in most other countries. On modern mobile telephones and many voice over IP services, the plus sign can usually be dialed and functions directly as the international access code.

Special services
Within the system of country calling codes, the ITU has defined certain prefixes for special services, and assigns such codes for independent international networks, such as satellite systems, spanning beyond the scope of regional authorities.

Some special service codes are the following:
 +388 5 – shared code for groups of nations
 +388 3 – European Telephony Numbering Space – Europe-wide services (discontinued)
 +800 – International Freephone (UIFN)
 +808 – reserved for Shared Cost Services
 +878 – Universal Personal Telecommunications services
 +881 – Global Mobile Satellite System
 +882 and +883 – International Networks
 +888 - international disaster relief operations
 +979 – International Premium Rate Service
 +991 – International Telecommunications Public Correspondence Service trial (ITPCS)
 +999 – reserved for future global service

Satellite telephone systems
Satellite phones are typically issued with telephone numbers with a special country calling code, for example:
 Inmarsat: +870: SNAC (Single Network Access Code)
 ICO Global: +881 0, +881 1
 Ellipso: +881 2, +881 3
 Iridium: +881 6, +881 7
 Globalstar: +881 8, +881 9
 Emsat: +882 13
 Thuraya: +882 16
 ACeS: +882 20
Some satellite phones are issued with ordinary phone numbers, such as Globalstar satellite phones issued with NANP telephone numbers.

Private numbering plan
Like a public telecommunications network, a private telephone network in an enterprise or within an organizational campus may implement a private numbering plan for the installed base of telephones for internal communication. Such networks operate a private switching system or a private branch exchange (PBX) within the network. The internal numbers assigned are often called extension numbers, as the internal numbering plan extends an official, published main access number for the entire network. A caller from within the network only dials the extension number assigned to another internal destination telephone.

A private numbering plan provides the convenience of mapping station telephone numbers to other commonly used numbering schemes in an enterprise. For example, station numbers may be assigned as the room number of a hotel or hospital. Station numbers may also be strategically mapped to certain keywords composed from the letters on the telephone dial, such as 4357 (help) to reach a help desk.

The internal number assignments may be independent of any direct inward dialing (DID) services provided by external telecommunication vendors. For numbers without DID access, the internal switch relays externally originated calls via an operator, an automated attendant or an electronic interactive voice response system. Telephone numbers for users within such systems are often published by suffixing the official telephone number with the extension number, e.g., 1 (800) 555-0001 x2055.

Some systems may automatically map a large block of DID numbers (differing only in a trailing sequence of digits) to a corresponding block of individual internal stations, allowing each of them to be reached directly from the public switched telephone network.  In some of these cases, a special shorter dial-in number can be used to reach an operator who can be asked for general information, e.g. help looking up or connecting to internal numbers. For example, individual extensions at Universität des Saarlandes can be dialed directly from outside via their four-digit internal extension +49-681-302-xxxx, whereas the university's official main number is +49-681-302-0 (49 is the country code for Germany, 681 is the area code for Saarbrücken, 302 the prefix for the university).

Callers within a private numbering plan often dial a trunk prefix to reach a national or international destination (outside line) or to access a leased line (or tie-line) to another location within the same enterprise. A large manufacturer with factories and offices in multiple cities may use a prefix (such as '8') followed by an internal routing code to indicate a city or location, then an individual four- or five-digit extension number at the destination site. A common trunk prefix for an outside line on North American systems is the digit 9, followed by the outside destination number.

Additional dial plan customisations, such as single-digit access to a hotel front desk or room service from an individual room, are available at the sole discretion of the PBX owner.

Numbering plan indicator
Signaling in telecommunication networks is specific to the technology in use for each link. During signaling, it is common that additional information is passed between switching systems that is not represented in telephone numbers, which serve only as network addresses of endpoints. One such information element is the numbering plan indicator (NPI). It is a number defined in the ITU standard Q.713, paragraph 3.4.2.3.3, indicating the numbering plan of the attached telephone number. NPIs can be found in Signalling Connection Control Part (SCCP) and short message service (SMS) messages. , the following numbering plans and their respective numbering plan indicator values have been defined:

Subscriber dialing procedures
While a telephone numbering plan specifies the digit sequence assigned to each telephone or wire line, establishing the network addresses needed for routing calls, numbering plan administrators may define certain dialing procedures for placing calls. This may include the dialing of additional prefixes necessary for administrative or technical reasons, or it may permit short code sequences for convenience or speed of service, such as in cases of emergency. The body of dialing procedures of a numbering plan administration is often called a dial plan.

A dial plan establishes the expected sequence of digits dialed on subscriber premises equipment, such as telephones, in private branch exchange (PBX) systems, or in other telephone switches to effect access to the telephone networks for the routing of telephone calls, or to effect or activate specific service features by the local telephone company, such as 311 or 411 service.

Variable-length dialing
Within the North American Numbering Plan (NANP), the administration defines standard and permissive dialing procedures, specifying the number of mandatory digits to be dialed for local calls within a single numbering plan area (NPA), as well as alternate, optional sequences, such as adding the prefix 1 before the telephone number.

Despite the closed numbering plan in the NANP, different dialing procedures exist in many of the territories for local and long-distance telephone calls. This means that to call another number within the same city or area, callers need to dial only a subset of the full telephone number. For example, in the NANP, only the seven-digit number may need to be dialed, but for calls outside the local numbering plan area, the full number including the area code is required. In these situations, ITU-T Recommendation E.123 suggests to list the area code in parentheses, signifying that in some cases the area code is optional or may not be required.

Internationally, an area code is typically prefixed by a domestic trunk access code (usually 0) when dialing from inside a country, but is not necessary when calling from other countries; there are exceptions, such as for Italian land lines.

To call a number in Sydney, Australia, for example:
 xxxx xxxx (within Sydney and other locations within New South Wales and the Australian Capital Territory - no area code required)
 (02) xxxx xxxx (outside New South Wales and the Australian Capital Territory, but still within Australia - the area code is required)
 +61 2 xxxx xxxx (outside Australia)

The plus character (+) in the markup signifies that the following digits are the country code, in this case 61. Some phones, especially mobile telephones, allow the + to be entered directly. For other devices the user must replace the + with the international access code for their current location. In the United States, most carriers require the caller to dial 011 before the destination country code. 

New Zealand has a special-case dial plan. While most nations require the area code to be dialed only if it is different, in New Zealand, one needs to dial the area code if the phone is outside the local calling area. For example, the town of Waikouaiti is in the Dunedin City Council jurisdiction, and has phone numbers (03) 465 7xxx. To call the city council in central Dunedin (03) 477 4000, residents must dial the number in full, including the area code, even though the area code is the same, as Waikouaiti and Dunedin lie in different local calling areas (Palmerston and Dunedin, respectively.)

In many areas of the NANP, the domestic trunk code (long-distance access code) must also be dialed along with the area code for long-distance calls even within the same numbering plan area.  For example, to call a number in Regina in area code 306 (Regina and the rest of the province of Saskatchewan are also served by the overlay code 639):
 306 xxx xxxx — within Regina, Lumsden and other local areas
 1 306 xxx xxxx — within Saskatchewan, but not within the Regina local calling area, e.g., Saskatoon
 1 306 xxx xxxx — anywhere within the NANP outside Saskatchewan

In many parts of North America, especially in area code overlay plans, dialing the area code, or 1 and the area code, is required even for local calls. Dialing from mobile phones does not require the trunk code in the US, although it is still necessary for calling all long-distance numbers from a mobile phone in Canada. Many mobile handsets automatically add the area code of the set's telephone number for outbound calls, if not dialed by the user.

In some parts of the United States, especially northeastern states such as Pennsylvania served by Verizon Communications, the ten-digit number must be dialed. If the call is not local, the call fails unless the dialed number is preceded by digit 1. Thus:
  610 xxx xxxx — local calls within the 610 area code and its overlay (484), as well as calls to or from the neighboring 215 area code and its overlay, 267.  Area code is required; one of two completion options for mobile phones within the U.S.
  1 610 xxx xxxx — calls from numbers outside the 610/484 and 215/267 area codes; second of two completion options for mobile phones within the U.S.

In California and New York, because of the existence of both overlay area codes (where an area code must be dialed for every call) and non-overlay area codes (where an area code is dialed only for calls outside the subscriber's home area code), "permissive home area code dialing" of 1 + the area code within the same area code, even if no area code is required, has been permitted since the mid-2000s.  For example, in the 559 area code (a non-overlay area code), calls may be dialed as 7 digits (XXX-XXXX) or 1 559 + 7 digits. The manner in which a call is dialed does not affect the billing of the call.  This "permissive home area code dialing" helps maintain uniformity and eliminates confusion given the different types of area code relief that has made California the nation's most "area code" intensive State. Unlike other states with overlay area codes (Texas, Maryland, Florida and Pennsylvania and others), the California Public Utilities Commission and the New York State Public Service Commission maintain two different dial plans: Landlines must dial 1 + area code whenever an Area Code is part of the dialed digits while cellphone users can omit the "1" and just dial 10 digits.

Many organizations have private branch exchange systems which permit dialing the access digit(s) for an outside line (usually 9 or 8), a "1" and finally the local area code and xxx xxxx in areas without overlays.  This aspect is unintentionally helpful for employees who reside in one area code and work in an area code with one, two, or three adjacent area codes.  1+ dialing to any area code by an employee can be done quickly, with all exceptions processed by the private branch exchange and passed onto the public switched telephone network.

Full-number dialing
In small countries or areas, the full telephone number is used for all calls, even in the same area. This has traditionally been the case in small countries and territories where area codes have not been required.  However, there has been a trend in many countries towards making all numbers a standard length, and incorporating the area code into the subscriber's number. This usually makes the use of a trunk code obsolete.
For example, to call someone in Oslo in Norway before 1992, it was necessary to dial:
 xxx xxx              (within Oslo - no area code required)
 (02) xxx xxx         (within Norway - outside Oslo)
 +47 2 xxx xxx        (outside Norway)

After 1992, this changed to a closed eight-digit numbering plan, e.g.:
 22xx xxxx     (within Norway - including Oslo)
 +47 22xx xxxx (outside Norway)

However, in other countries, such as France, Belgium, Japan, Switzerland, South Africa and some parts of North America, the trunk code is retained for domestic calls, whether local or national, e.g.,

 Paris 01 xx xx xx xx (outside France +33 1 xxxx xxxx)
 Brussels 02 xxx xxxx (outside Belgium +32 2 xxx xxxx)
 Geneva 022 xxx xxxx  (outside Switzerland +41 22 xxx xxxx)
 Cape Town 021 xxx xxxx (outside South Africa +27 21 xxx xxxx)
 New York 1 212 xxx xxxx (outside the North American Numbering Plan +1 212 xxx xxxx)
 Fukuoka 092 xxx xxxx (outside the Japanese Numbering Plan +81 92 xxx xxxx)
 India "0-10 Digit Number" (outside India +91 XXXXXXXXXX). In India due to the availability of multiple operators, the metro cities have short codes which range from 2 to 8 digits. 

While some, like Italy, require the initial zero to be dialed, even for calls from outside the country, e.g.,

 Rome 06 xxxxxxxx (outside Italy +39 06 xxxxxxxx)

While dialing of full national numbers takes longer than a local number without the area code, the increased use of phones that can store numbers means that this is of decreasing importance. It also makes it easier to display numbers in the international format, as no trunk code is required—hence a number in Prague, Czech Republic, can now be displayed as:

 2xx xxx xxx (inside Czech Republic)
 +420 2xx xxx xxx (outside Czech Republic)

as opposed to before September 21, 2002:

 02 / xx xx xx xx  (inside Czech Republic)
 +420 2 / xx xx xx xx (outside Czech Republic)

Some countries already switched, but trunk prefix re-added with the closed dialing plan, for example in Bangkok, Thailand before 1997:
 xxx-xxxx (inside Bangkok)
 02-xxx-xxxx (inside Thailand)
 +66 2-xxx-xxxx (outside Thailand)

This was changed in 1997:
 2-xxx-xxxx (inside Thailand)
 +66 2-xxx-xxxx (outside Thailand)

Trunk prefix was re-added in 2001
 02-xxx-xxxx (inside Thailand)
 +66 2-xxx-xxxx (outside Thailand)

See also

 :Category:Telephone numbers by country
 National conventions for writing telephone numbers
 List of country calling codes
 List of North American Numbering Plan area codes
 Carrier access code
 Telephone exchange names

References

External links
 List of ITU-T Recommendation E.164 assigned country codes as of 15 Dec 2016
  List of ITU-T Recommendation E.164 Dialling Procedures as of 15 DEC 2011

Telephone numbers
ITU-T recommendations
Identifiers
numbering plan